The Polyceridae are a taxonomic family of sea slugs, dorid nudibranchs, marine gastropod mollusks within the superfamily Polyceroidea.

Taxonomy 
The family Polyceridae is classified within the clade Doridacea, itself belonging to the clade Euctenidiacea within the clade Nudipleura (according to the taxonomy of the Gastropoda by Bouchet & Rocroi, 2005).

The Polyceridae consists of these subfamilies:
 Kalinginae Pruvot-Fol, 1956
 Kankelibranchinae Ortea, Espinosa & Caballer, 2005
 Nembrothinae Burn, 1967
 Polycerinae Alder & Hancock, 1845 - synonyms: Triopinae Gray, 1847, Euphuridae Iredale & O'Donoghue, 1923, Gymnodorididae Odhner, 1941
 Triophinae Odhner, 1941
 tribe Triophini Odhner, 1941 - synonym: Kaloplocaminae Pruvot-Fol, 1954
 tribe Limaciini Winckworth, 1951 - synonym: Lailinae Burn, 1967

Genera 
Genera in the Polyceridae include:

 Subfamily Kalinginae  Pruvot-Fol, 1956 
 Genus Kalinga Alder & Hancock, 1864  - type genus in the subfamily Kalinginae
 Subfamily Kankelibranchinae Ortea, Espinosa & Caballer, 2005
 Genus Kankelibranchus Ortea, Espinosa & Caballer, 2005
 Subfamily Nembrothinae  Burn, 1967 
 Genus Martadoris Willan & Chang, 2017
 Genus Nembrotha Bergh, 1877 - type genus in the subfamily Nembrothinae
 Genus Roboastra Bergh, 1877
 Genus Tambja Burn, 1962
 Genus Tyrannodoris Willan & Chang, 2017
 Subfamily Polycerinae Alder & Hancock, 1845
 Genus Greilada Bergh, 1894 
 Genus Gymnodoris Stimpson, 1855
 Genus Lamellana Lin, 1992
 Genus Lecithophorus Macnae, 1958
 Genus Palio Gray, 1857
 Genus Paliolla Burn, 1958
 Genus Polycera Cuvier, 1817 - type genus in the family Polyceridae
 Genus Polycerella A. E. Verrill, 1881
 Genus Thecacera Fleming, 1828
 Subfamily Triophinae  Odhner, 1941 
 Genus Colga Bergh, 1880 
 Genus Crimora  Alder and Hancock, 1855 
 Genus Heteroplocamus Oliver, 1915
 Genus Holoplocamus Odhner, 1926
 Genus Joubiniopsis Risbec, 1928
 Genus Kaloplocamus Bergh, 1893
 Genus Limacia O.F. Müller, 1781
 Genus Plocamopherus (Rüppell & Leuckart, 1831)
 Genus Triopha Bergh, 1880  - type genus in the subfamily Triophinae

Genera brought into synonymy
 Genus Cabrilla Fewkes, 1889: synonym of Triopha Bergh, 1880
 Genus Euplocamus Philippi, 1836: synonym of Kaloplocamus Bergh, 1892
 Genus Histiophorus Pease, 1860: synonym of Plocamopherus Rüppell in Rüppell & Leuckart, 1828
 Genus Issa Bergh, 1881: synonym of Colga Bergh, 1880
 Genus Issena Iredale & O'Donoghue, 1923: synonym of Colga Bergh, 1880:
 Genus Laila MacFarland 1905: synonym of Limacia Muller, 1781 
 Genus Peplidia Lowe, 1842: synonym of Plocamopherus Rüppell in Rüppell & Leuckart, 1828

References

 http://www.seaslugforum.net accessed 16 September 2009
 Gosliner, T.M. 1987. Nudibranchs of Southern Africa 
 Vaught, K.C. (1989). A classification of the living Mollusca. American Malacologists: Melbourne, FL (USA). . XII, 195 pp.